Protein database may refer to:

Any protein structure database
Any protein sequence database
Exact names
"Protein" database of the National Institute of Health
Protein Database of Bio-Synthesis, Inc.